Live at the Riverboat 1969 is a live album by Neil Young, released in 2009. In February 1969, Young performed a series of shows at the Riverboat coffee house in Toronto. This album is a live recording from these performances.

This album is Volume 1 in the Archives Performance Series.

A CD sampler of the album was released in selected retail outlets alongside Young's 2007 album, Chrome Dreams II. The different outlets had different bonus CDs with a different preview track.

The album has never been given a standalone release and was only included as part of the Neil Young Archives Vol. 1: 1963–1972 box set.

Track listing
All songs written by Neil Young.
 Emcee Intro. / Sugar Mountain Intro. – 1:10
 "Sugar Mountain" – 5:34
 Incredible Doctor Rap – 3:10 
 "The Old Laughing Lady" – 5:14
 Audience Observation / Dope Song / Band Names Rap – 2:59
 "Flying on the Ground Is Wrong" – 3:58
 On the Way Home Intro. – 0:25
 "On the Way Home" – 2:40
 Set Break / Emcee Intro. – 1:20
 "I've Loved Her So Long" – 2:13
 Allen A-Dale Rap – 2:20
 "I Am a Child" – 2:27
 "1956 Bubblegum Disaster" – 2:04
 "The Last Trip to Tulsa" – 7:00
 Words Rap – 2:14 
 "Broken Arrow" – 4:38
 Turn Down the Lights Rap – 0:53
 "Whiskey Boot Hill" – 2:22
 Expecting to Fly Intro. – 0:54
 "Expecting to Fly" – 2:55

References

Neil Young live albums
2009 live albums
Reprise Records live albums
Albums produced by Neil Young